Raymond Stewart (born 15 November 1944) is a New Zealand former cricketer. He played first-class cricket for Central Districts and Otago between 1963 and 1975.

See also
 List of Otago representative cricketers

References

External links
 

1944 births
Living people
New Zealand cricketers
Central Districts cricketers
Otago cricketers
Cricketers from Dunedin